The National Security Service (NSS) is the principle intelligence service of Armenia, responsible for foreign intelligence, counterintelligence, national security affairs, and cryptography. The service is also responsible for the Armenian Border Guard and the security detail for the Prime Minister of Armenia. The NSS succeeded the KGB of the Armenian SSR following the dissolution of the Soviet Union. Despite other former Soviet republics reorganizing their intelligence services and modeling them on the Russian intelligence community, the organizational structure of the NSS remains closer to that of the former KGB, comprised mainly of active duty members of the Ministry of Defence. The NSS is headquartered on Nalbandyan Street in the Kentron district of downtown Yerevan.

History 

In late September 1991, the Soviet republic of Armenia declared its independence and began the process of restructuring its Soviet-era security agencies, including the Committee for State Security (KGB) of the Armenian SSR. According to a law on the structure and composition of the government adopted on 4 December 1991, the KGB was renamed into the State Directorate of National Security, with Major General Husik Suren Harutyunyan becoming its first director, serving until February 1992.

Between 1996 and 1999, the government went through the process of uniting the Ministry of National Security and the Ministry of Internal Affairs into one department.  Despite rumors that the NSS will be dismembered into several departments to follow a Russian format, the service runs with a KGB-style semi-militarized structure which remains unchanged since its establishment. On 17 December 2002, President Robert Kocharyan restructured the National Security Ministry into the NSS.

Operations 
It is known to have participated in both the 2016 Yerevan hostage crisis and the 2018 anti-corruption crackdown. During the 2020 Nagorno-Karabakh war, 46 servicemen of the NSS Border Troops were killed, with 191 others wounded, and 2 declared missing. During the protests following the 2020 Karabkah ceasefire agreement, the NSS foiled an assassination attempt on Prime Minister Nikol Pashinyan, uncovering the illegal acquisition and storage of weapons and explosives by a group of people led by former NSS operative and director Artur Vanetsyan.

Structure 
The NSS has traditionally been structured closer to its predecessor, the KGB, than other post-Soviet states, however since reforms by Prime Minister Nikol Pashinyan in 2018, the service has reorganized and consolidated. Two services have been derived directly from the organization of the Russian Federal Security Service (FSB):

 Department of Intelligence
 Department of Counterintelligence
 Department of Military Counterintelligence
 Department of Protection of Constitutional Order and Fight against Terrorism – modeled on the 2nd Service of the Russian FSB
 Department of Economic Security and Countering Corruption – modeled on the 4th Service of the Russian FSB
 Investigation Department
 Territorial Authorities
 Border troops – under the control of the NSS since 2004 when it was transferred from the Ministry of Defence.

 Central Administration

Recruitment 
Service in the NSS is open to all Armenian citizens under the age of 30 who are fluent in Armenian. Males must have fulfilled or been exempted from compulsory service requirements. All applicants must meet military physical fitness requirements, and pass physical and mental health examinations as well as a polygraph. The service prefers recruits speak at least one other language, while recruits who attend training programs in Russia must also be fluent in Russian.

NSS intelligence officers are often trained through the intelligence schools of the Russian Federation, to include the Federal Security Service (FSB) academy. Students who attend the FSB academy graduate from the five year residential program with a degree in law and a commission as a lieutenant in the Armenian military.

Recruits to the Armenian Border Guard attend five year residential training programs in Russia at the Oryol campus of the FSB's Moscow Border Institute, or either the Kurgan or Kaliningrad Border Guard Institutes, graduating with a degree in engineering and a commission as a lieutenant in the Border Guard.

NSS Union 

In April 2021, group of former senior NSS officials formed an organization called the Union of NSS Reserve Officers. The union includes, in particular, ex-director of the NSS Artur Vanetsyan, former commander of the border troops Armen Abrahamyan, former Deputy Head of the NSS Grigory Harutyunyan, and former Acting Director of the NSS Mikael Hambardzumyan. The task of the union is to confront the challenges and threats to security, collect facts of the subversive activities of some structures, and use the experience of officers to solve the country's security problems. Although initially created as an apolitical structure, it supported the army officials who signed a statement drafted by General Staff calling for the resignation of Prime Minister Nikol Pashinyan.

Directors of the National Security Service 
Directors of the National Security Service since the end of the KGB of the Armenian SSR:
Major General Usik Harutyunyan (1991–1992)
Major General Valery Poghosyan (1992–1993)
Major General Eduard Simonyants (1993–1994)
David Shahnazaryan (1994–1995)
Serzh Sargsyan (1996–1999)
Lieutenant General Carlos Petrosyan (1999–2004)
Colonel General Gorik Hakobyan (2004–2016)
Major General Georgi Kutoyan (2016–2018)
Major General Artur Vanetsyan (2018–2019)
Colonel Eduard Martirosyan (2019–2020)
Colonel Argishti Kyaramyan (June 2020–October 2020)
Colonel Armen Abazyan (November 2020–present)

See also
 Prosecutor General of Armenia

References 

Armenian intelligence agencies
Government agencies established in 1992
Intelligence agencies
1992 establishments in Armenia